Riddles is the third studio album by American rock duo Ed Schrader's Music Beat. The album features the single "Dunce". The album was produced and co-written by electronic-pop musician Dan Deacon.

Reception
Riddles was met with "generally favorable" reviews from critics. At Metacritic, which assigns a weighted average rating out of 100 to reviews from mainstream publications, this release received an average score of 77 based on five reviews. Aggregate website AnyDecentMusic? gave the release a 7 out of 10 based on a critical consensus of five reviews.

Writing in Pitchforks review of Riddles, Nina Corcoran described the collaboration between the band and producer Dan Deacon as "a new musical direction... By lacing arms with Dan Deacon, the duo throw themselves into an auspicious zone, creating an album that remains introspective even at its wildest moments."

Accolades

Track listing

References

2018 albums
Carpark Records albums